Novosibirsk Tuberculosis Research Institute (NTRI)) is a Federal State Budgetary Institution of the Ministry of Health  of the Russian Federation and  it specializes in the research and treatment of tuberculosis. NTRI provides the organization of TB care to the population in the regions of the Siberian and Far Eastern Federal Districts of Russia.

History 
By the Order of Soviet of People's Commissars №19533-r from October 4, 1943 the Novosibirsk Tuberculosis Research Institute was established on the basis of equipment and personnel of the Central TB Research Institute, which was evacuated from Moscow to Novosibirsk during The Great Patriotic War, World War II, in 1941.

Structure 
The Institute has the following departments:
 Administration
 Accounting
 Human resources
 Economists
 Quality control
 Scientific Department
 Scientific organizational sector
 Informational Technology
 Clinical Sector
 Laboratory and Experimental sector
 Clinical Department
 Surgery
 Anesthesiology and Intensive Care
 Urogenital TB
 Therapeutical #1 for TB
 Therapeutical #2 for MDR TB
 Day Care Unit
 Consultative and Diagnostic Centre
 Radiology (including MRT)
 Endoscopy
 Physiotherapy
 Laboratories
 Bacteriology
 Biochemistry
 Clinical diagnostics
 Pathomorphology
 Functional diagnostics
 Service Departments
 Pharmacy
 Technical support units
 Food processing
 Transportation
 Laundry

Leaders 
The first director of the Novosibirsk Scientific Research Institute of Tuberculosis was Dr Alexandra Apollonovna Letunova.
Later NTRI led by:
 Anna Georgievna Aminina;
 Rihard Karlovich Lozinger;
 Mikhail Vasilievich Svirezhev;
 Boris Nikolaevich Priss;
 Igor Grigorievich Ursov;
 Alexey Sevastyanovich Tarasov;
 Vladimir Aleksandrovich Krasnov;
 Acting Director since 10 December 2019 - Natalia Vasilievna Stavitskaya

Areas of expertise 
NTRI provides clinical, scientific, organizational and methodological work.

Organizational and methodological: NTRI creates, supports and improves a system of effective TB control services for 21 subjects of the two federal districts of the Russian Federation:
 10 subjects in  Siberian Federal District: Altai Republic,  Republic of Tuva, Republic of Khakassia, Altai krai, Krasnoyarsk Territory, Irkutsk Oblast, Kemerovo oblast, Novosibirsk oblast, Omsk oblast, Tomsk region.
 11 subjects in Far Eastern Federal District:  The Republic of Buryatia, Republic of Sakha-Yakutia, Zabaikalsky krai, Kamchatka krai, Primorsky krai, Khabarovsk krai, Amur Oblast, Magadan Oblast, Sakhalin Oblast, Jewish Autonomous Region, Chukotka Autonomous Okrug.
NTRI provides MoH RF with epidemiological data and data analysis and forecasting.

Science: NTRI conducts preclinical, clinical trials of drugs and medical devices according to international standards, the Institution is providing with experimental design and analysis of specialized scientific publications and developed medical software products.

Clinic: NTRI as a tertiary level health care facility carries out all types of diagnostics and treatment of tuberculosis, including the provision of high-technological and specialized medical care for patients from the Siberian and Far Eastern Federal Districts of the Russian Federation. In the Institute, osteoplastic thoracoplasty (a variant of extrapleural thoracoplasty) has been used and improved for the last 50 years for patients with complicated cavitary forms of TB for whom lung resection is contraindicated.

Since 2010 the NTRI is the Collaborating Centre of the World Health Organization  (RUS-123).

NTRI TB Bacteriological laboratory of NTRI is a Centre of Excellence (NCE-CRL) Supranational Reference Laboratories Network WHO (SRLN)

References

External links
 The NTRI Website in English
 in Russian: NTRI at MoH RF Website
 Stop TB Partnership: Partner's Directory - NTRI

Medical research institutes in Russia
Medical research institutes in the Soviet Union
Research and development in Russia
Science and technology in Russia
1943 establishments in Russia
Tuberculosis organizations
Zayeltsovsky City District, Novosibirsk
Science and technology in Siberia
T
Health in the Soviet Union
Hospitals in Novosibirsk